On the occasion of the 50th anniversary of the founding of the International Federation of Gymnastics which was founded in 1881, a commemorative competition was held in Paris, on July 11 & 12, in conjunction with that year's Bastille Day.  Although it has at times been referred to as the "First Artistic Men's World Championships", its results often seem to be ignored by various authorities in the sport.

44 individuals from 10 nations participated in this competition.  14 events were contested.  Individual rankings were determined.

Men's individual all around

Rankings

Medalists
There was a special clause to the rules that in order for any individual to be properly termed 'World Champion', they had to demonstrate a certain level of competency among all 14 events, scoring at least 60% of all of the points that could be possibly awarded on each event.  Therefore, the highest-ranking gymnast, Heikki Savolainen of Finland did not actually end up becoming World Champion; rather, 2nd-place finishing Alois Hudec of Czechoslovakia, who was the only individual to score at least 60% on all 14 events, ended up becoming 'World Champion' at this competition.

Men's floor exercise

Men's rings

Men's vault

Men's parallel bars

Men's horizontal bar

References

World Artistic Gymnastics Championships